Daniel Simon (born 16 November 1988) is a German Paralympic swimmer who competes in international level events. He is a World champion and triple European bronze medalist, he has competed at the Paralympic Games three times.

References

External links
 
 

1988 births
Living people
Sportspeople from Darmstadt
Paralympic swimmers of Germany
Swimmers at the 2008 Summer Paralympics
Swimmers at the 2012 Summer Paralympics
Swimmers at the 2016 Summer Paralympics
Medalists at the World Para Swimming Championships
German male freestyle swimmers
German male butterfly swimmers
German male backstroke swimmers
S13-classified Paralympic swimmers
21st-century German people